Gryllinae, or field crickets, are a subfamily of insects in the order Orthoptera and the family Gryllidae.

They hatch in spring, and the young crickets (called nymphs) eat and grow rapidly. They shed their skin (molt) eight or more times before they become adults.

Field crickets eat a broad range of food: seeds, plants, or insects (dead or alive). They are known to feed on grasshopper eggs, pupae of Lepidoptera (moths and butterflies) and Diptera (flies). Occasionally they may rob spiders of their prey. Field crickets also eat grass.

In the British Isles "field cricket" refers specifically to Gryllus campestris, but the common name may also be used for G. assimilis, G. bimaculatus, G. firmus, G. pennsylvanicus, G. rubens, and G. texensis, along with other members of various genera including Acheta, Gryllodes, Gryllus, and Teleogryllus.
Acheta domesticus, the House cricket, and Gryllus bimaculatus are raised in captivity for use as pets.

Identification
Field crickets are normally  in size, depending on the species, and can be black, red or brown in color. While both males and females have very similar basic body plans, each has its own distinguishing feature(s).

This ovipositor allows the female to bury her fertilized eggs into the ground for protection and development. In some female field crickets, species can be distinguished by comparing the length of the ovipositor to the length of the body (e.g., G. rubens has a longer ovipositor than G. texensis).

Males are distinguished from females by the absence of an ovipositor. At the end of the abdomen there are simply two cerci. Unlike females, however, males are able to produce sounds or chirps. Thus, males can be identified through sound while females cannot.

Diagram A shows the male cricket with its wings raised for the purpose of chirping. Diagram B shows the female cricket, identified via the long protruding ovipositor at the end of the abdomen. D and E show the female using the ovipositor to deposit the fertilized eggs into the ground. Diagram C shows a topical and side view of nymphs with no protrusion at the hind of the abdomen.

Behaviour
Females evaluate these songs and move towards the ones that signal the male's good health. When the male senses the presence of a female he will produce a softer courting song. After mating, the female will search for a place to lay her eggs, preferably in warm, damp (though not wet) soil.

Field crickets prefer to live in outdoor environments with high humidity, warm temperatures, moist rich soil, and adequate food, but will migrate into human structures when environmental conditions outside become unfavorably cool. They often gain entry into buildings via open doors and windows as well as cracks in poorly fitted windows, foundations, or siding.

Unlike House crickets, which can adapt themselves to indoor conditions, populations of field crickets living in human structures and buildings and without access to warm moist soil for depositing their eggs tend to die out within a few months. Consequently, field crickets in temperate regions exhibit diapause.

Tribes and selected genera
Six tribes have been identified in this subfamily:

Cephalogryllini
Auth.: Otte & Alexander, 1983 - Australia
 Apterogryllus Saussure, 1877
 Cephalogryllus Chopard, 1925
 Daintria Otte, 1994
 Notosciobia Chopard, 1915

Eurygryllodini
Auth.: Gorochov, 1990 - Australia
 Eurygryllodes Chopard, 1951
 Maluagryllus Otte, 1994

Gryllini
Worldwide, selected genera include: 
 Acheta Fabricius, 1775
 Brachytrupes Serville, 1838
 Gryllodinus Bolívar, 1927
 Gryllita Hebard, 1935
 Gryllodes Saussure, 1874
 Gryllus Linnaeus, 1758
 Gymnogryllus Saussure, 1877
 Loxoblemmus Saussure, 1877
 Melanogryllus Pallas, 1771
 Miogryllus Saussure, 1877
 Teleogryllus Chopard, 1961

Modicogryllini

Worldwide except the Americas, selected genera include:
 Eumodicogryllus Gorochov, 1986
 Lepidogryllus Otte & Alexander, 1983
 Modicogryllus Chopard, 1961
 Velarifictorus Randell (1964)

Sciobiini
Auth.: Randell, 1964 - NW Africa, Iberian peninsula
 Sciobia Burmeister, 1838

Turanogryllini
Auth.: Otte, 1987 - Africa, SE Europe, Middle East, southern Asia through to Korea and Indo-China
 Neogryllopsis Otte, 1983
 Podogryllus Karsch, 1893
 Turanogryllus Tarbinsky, 1940

Genera incertae sedis

 Allogryllus Chopard, 1925
 Apiotarsus Saussure, 1877
 Callogryllus Sjöstedt, 1910
 Coiblemmus Chopard, 1936
 Comidoblemmus Storozhenko & Paik, 2009
 Cryncus Gorochov, 1983
 Danielottea Koçak & Kemal, 2009
 Gryllodeicus Chopard, 1939
 Grylloderes Bolívar, 1894
 Hispanogryllus Otte & Perez-Gelabert, 2009
 Itaropsis Chopard, 1925
 Jarawasia Koçak & Kemal, 2008
 Mayumbella Otte, 1987
 Meristoblemmus Jones & Chopard, 1936
 Nemobiodes Chopard, 1917
 Oediblemmus Saussure, 1898
 Oligachaeta Chopard, 1961
 Omogryllus Otte, 1987
 Platygryllus Chopard, 1961
 Parasciobia Chopard, 1935
 Qingryllus Chen & Zheng, 1995
 Rubrogryllus Vickery, 1997
 Songella Otte, 1987
 Stephoblemmus Saussure, 1877
 Stilbogryllus Gorochov, 1983
 Svercoides Gorochov, 1990
 Taciturna Otte, 1987
 Thiernogryllus Roy, 1969
 Zebragryllus Desutter-Grandcolas & Cadena-Castañeda, 2014

References

 
Orthoptera subfamilies